Waiwera Hot Pools is a hot springs system located in the small coastal village of Waiwera, just north of Auckland, New Zealand. They were known to the Māori people for centuries before being developed. In the 1960s and 70s overproduction and overpumping of the geothermal aquifer led to significant loss of pressure and desiccation of the springs in the late 1970. A decade later the thermal springs began to recover, although the system has not returned to the former artesian conditions.

The commercial establishment, Waiwera Hot Pools, a large thermal spa and water park,  was branded as Waiwera Infinity Thermal Spa Resort at the time of closure in 2018. The park had been New Zealand's largest water park. The complex claimed 350,000 visitors per year and consisted of 26 pools plus various slides. The park closed to visitors in February 2018.

History

The presence of hot springs bubbling up through the sands of Waiwera Beach was known to Māori in pre-European times, and the name Waiwera means 'hot water'. Commercialisation commenced in 1875 when Scottish-born entrepreneur Robert Graham built bathing facilities at the beach and a hotel nearby. The resort became one of the most popular attractions in the Auckland Region during the 1870s, when a regular steam boat service brought tourists from central Auckland to the resort.

The natural springs ceased flowing in the 1870s, when Graham bored into the earth, and began bottling and selling Waiwera mineral water.

In the 20th century, the resort was redeveloped into a modern water park. Water activities included hydroslides such as Speed slide, Twister and Kids Chute; Lazy River; Movie pool showing 3 movies a day; Aquacise fitness classes and Swimming school. In February 2018 the park was closed to visitors and has since fallen into a state of disrepair.

References

Hot springs of New Zealand
Spas
Hibiscus and Bays Local Board Area
Landforms of the Auckland Region
1875 establishments in New Zealand
2018 disestablishments in New Zealand
Swimming venues in New Zealand